ROLM Corporation was a technology company founded in Silicon Valley in 1969. IBM Corp. partnered with the company, and ROLM Mil-Spec was sold to Loral Corporation and later to Lockheed Martin in 1996 as Tactical Defense Systems. IBM's ROLM division was later half sold to Siemens AG in 1989, whereupon the manufacturing and development became wholly owned by Siemens and called ROLM Systems, while marketing and service became a joint venture of IBM with Siemens, called ROLM Company. After nearly 30 years, phone products with the name "Rolm" were discontinued in the late 1990s, as sales dropped in markets dominated by new technology with other products or other companies.

Products

The ROLM corporation had two distinct operations, depending on the application of the associated hardware, with a cross blending of technologies from one division to the other.

Military Hardware 
The company first produced rugged mil-spec (military specification) computer systems running Data General software. The company divisionalized in 1978, becoming both Rolm Mil-Spec Computers and Rolm Telecom. The Telecom division spent much of the considerable profit realized by the Mil-Spec Computer division over the ensuing 1980s trying to penetrate the convoluted phone-interconnect business.

The first computer system was the 1601 Ruggednova Processor, announced at the 1969 Fall Joint Computer Conference with deliveries beginning in March 1970.  In the military it was designated the AN/UYK-12(V) It was a licensed implementation of the Data General Nova architecture.  It consisted of a 5-board processor card set and core or read only MOS memory in 4K increments up to 32K in a standard ATR box which contained the power supply and 14 card slots. The 1601 was a popular machine with RCA TIPI. The processor was developed into a smaller-form card set as the ALR-62 and ultimately into a single-card version as the ALR-46A, both sold to Dalmo Victor.

The Models 1602 and 1603 soon followed with greater capability and more memory - the ROLM 1602 was used on the AN/MLQ-34 TACJAM jamming system as the primary system computer and controller. The newer 1606 was leveraged into the Raytheon (Goleta) AN/SLQ-32 naval shipboard electronic warfare system for signal identification purposes and into units sold to Singer Librascope. Bob Maxfield and Alan Foster were responsible for the design of the early processor chassis until Art Wellman from Sylvania was brought in to take the computers to their next level mechanically. Both half-ATR and full-ATR-sized chassis were developed for a wide array of defense applications.

The 1602B and 2150 I/O boxes were developed and standardized expressly for the Army ILS program and were top sellers at the time. The Rolm 1602 was used on AN/MLQ-34 'TACJAM' as the primary mission computer. The 1666 was leveraged into the GLCM (Ground Launched Cruise Missile) and SLCM (Surface Launched Cruise Missile) hardware for McDonnell Douglas (MDAC), St. Louis, and the follow-on 1666B was incorporated into MDAC's Tomahawk Weapons Control System (TWCS). Despite developing most products with Rolm's own money, the substantial increase in military sales in the 1980s caused the loss of the commercial exemption enjoyed in the early years. This required all product-pricing to be negotiated directly with the DoD, so margins eroded somewhat. Some 32-bit machines (versus 16-bit) were developed into the Hawk/32 computer and sold well. Engineering in the latter years scrambled to come up with a new product line as the military was enticed into ruggedized commercial computer systems by Rugged Digital, and Rolm worked on a militarized version of Mercury Computer's Digital Signal Processor. Brisk sales of the DG-based computers continued up to the time the ROLM Mil-Spec Computer division was closed in June 1998.

Commercial hardware 
The Telecom division leveraged the 1603 processor into the heart of its original CBX. Over time, the company began to focus on digital voice, and produced some of the earliest examples of all-digital voice equipment, including Computerized Branch Exchanges (CBXs) and digital phones. Two of the most popular telecom systems were the ROLM CBX and ROLM Redwood (PBX and Key Systems Unit (KSU) models, respectively). The CBX was meant to directly compete with Northern Telecom's SL-1, AT&T Dimension telephone systems and other computerized digital-voice systems being developed at the time. By 1980, ROLM had shot past AT&T in number of systems deployed to become the #2 PBX in North America. The Redwood, often called the "Deadwood" by many ROLM techs because it never caught on, was intended to compete with the Nortel Norstar Key System. When Siemens bought ROLM from IBM and introduced their "newer" models, which were renamed Siemens switches, the early ROLM phone switches were widely pressed into service as old technology (though a number of 8000 and 9751-9005 CBXs remain online at some companies), but the digital phone handsets were quite valuable for those expanding their phone networks. The later ROLM 9200 (actually a Siemens HCM200 Hybrid system renamed) was more competition for the leading Key Systems as the 9200 had intensive Least Call Routing software, which the Redwood did not. The company also produced one of the first commercially successful voicemail systems, PhoneMail. Digital ROLM telephones, called ROLMphones, were unique from other telephones in many ways, one of which was a lack of a physical switchhook button. Instead, the handset contains a small magnet which triggers a switch in the phone base. The opening or closing of this switch lets the phone and system know if the phone is on hook (not in use) or off-hook (in use).

History
The company name "ROLM" was formed from the first letters of the founders names: Gene Richeson, Ken Oshman, Walter Loewenstern, and Robert Maxfield.  The four men had studied electrical engineering at Rice University and earned graduate degrees at Stanford University. At Rice, Oshman and Loewenstern were members of Wiess College. Not an original founder, Leo Chamberlain was hired and became very much the soul of ROLM, advancing progressive workplace ideas such as GPW (Great Place to Work). The Old Ironsides Drive campus (ROLM Campus-Santa Clara, CA) was equipped with a swimming pool, openspace park areas, a cafeteria and recreation center.

ROLM originally made flight computers for the military and heavy commercial industries such as oil exploration (Halliburton). Beginning in the early 1970s, International Paper Company bought a significant number of the 1602 series computers. These became the environmentally-hardened base for that company's in-house-developed process control system, which informally became known as the dual-ROLM. Later, in an attempt at diversification, ROLM themselves branched off into energy management by buying a company producing an early version of such a system and the telecom industry by designing the CBX, internally running a 1603 computer. It quickly outsold AT&T, who at the time had not come out with a digital PBX, and became #2 behind the Nortel SL-1 switch by 1980. At one point, ROLM was poised to overtake Nortel as the leader in PBX sales in North America.

In May 1982 IBM purchased 15% of Rolm. IBM partnered with and in 1984 acquired ROLM Corporation in Santa Clara, California. The Mil-Spec Computer portion of the business was sold to Loral Corporation when IBM's Federal Systems Division was determined by government regulatory agencies to be already too large and dominant in military markets to retain ROLM Mil-Spec. Ultimately the Mil-Spec group ended up in the hands of Lockheed Martin as Tactical Defense Systems.

In the phone markets, ROLM started to lose pace with Nortel, due to product issues, and they never recovered. The 9751 CBX, which has IBM's name on it, was initially a successful product; but when ISDN service became more affordable, IBM never really updated the 9751 to integrate correctly with ISDN. Nortel leaped ahead on that issue alone; AT&T (now Avaya) and others gained ground and started to overtake ROLM. IBM's ROLM division was later half sold to Siemens AG in 1989, whereupon manufacturing and development became wholly owned by Siemens and called ROLM Systems, while marketing and service became a joint venture of IBM with Siemens, called ROLM Company. By 1992, Siemens bought out IBM's share in ROLM and later changed its name to SiemensROLM Communications. However, the die was cast, and the downturn (across the telecom sector) continued. The ROLM name was eventually dropped in the late 1990s, though Siemens still retained copyright of it.

Currently, secondary vendors offer support for ROLM phone systems, including repair services for broken phones and sales of refurbished units and Phonemail systems. Many systems have remained in use in large-scale universities, institutions and some corporations (Entergy, School of the Art Institute of Chicago, Huntsman, The Southern Company, the Santa Fe railroad (now part of BNSF, etc.), which were large-scale ROLM users from the early days. These older systems are still known for being very reliable, though Siemens no longer offers updates or new models of the CBX. Siemens still offers some technical support, however, most real ROLM systems quietly keep running, and unless they suffered a lightning strike or an IBM hard-drive failure (in the 9751s), no support was really needed.

The Great America Campus was leveled and is now a parking lot for the adjacent Levi's Stadium.  The River Oaks campus was leveled and is now high density housing.  The Zanker campus remains as Broadcom.

CBX (Computer Branch eXchange) technical information
The original CBX were not named except for the software release (i.e., "Release 5" or "Release 6"), but then they changed with the release of the 7000 CBX, later becoming the 8000 (8000-8004 series, which had more memory and newer CPU cards as well as offering redundant critical electronics, power supplies, etc.). The models under the CBX and later CBXII product line were the VS (Very Small; one CPU and no redundant electronics and one half of a normal cabinet of the larger models), S (Small: similar to the VS but normal size cabinet and could be upgraded; offered power supply redundancy), M (redundant CPUs and electronics and power supply options) and L (multi-cabinet with total redundancy). The CBXII 8004 Mdump 18a was the last release of the original series.

In the early 80s, ROLM introduced the CBXII VL9000 ('VL' for Very Large). Multi-node capable, it could have up to 15 nodes with over 20,000 stations. The nodes could be connected via T1s or fiber. The box and a lot of hardware was similar or the same as the 8000 series, but the main bus and software were totally different. The 9000 could offer many newer features the 8000 could not. The 1st 9000VL was going to Georgia Power/Southern Company but was delayed in its delivery, while SN002 was delivered to Gulf States Utilities HQ in Beaumont, Texas and installed by GSU's own telecom group ahead of SN001 being delivered to Georgia. GSU, now part of Entergy, retired the VL9000 in the late 1990s, and it was replaced with a SiemensROLM 9006i (actually sold by Siemens overseas 1st as the HiCoM (HCM) 300 and was nothing like a real ROLM). Georgia Power ran their VLCBX in tandem with an existing multi-cabinet 8000 and each extension had a switch to select either of the two CBXs in case of a malfunction until the reliability of the VL model was up to acceptable standards. NASA's Johnson Space Center (JSC) in Clear Lake, TX was the push behind the 9000 series, with JSC eventually having a 13 node 9000VLCBX on its campus (replaced by a Siemens 9006i and later a Siemens HiPath switch).

The various models of IBM produced ROLM 9751 CBX are 10, 20, 40, 50 & 70. PhoneMail (succeeded by eXpressions470 in later VoIP offerings from Siemens but using the same command structure and female "Silicon Sally" voice). However, IBM did not keep up with telecom standards on the Central Office as well as it should have; which kept IBM/ROLM from delivering an ISDN PRI solution for the 9751 until late in the game. By then, Nortel, the old AT&T (later Lucent and now Avaya) as well as others had pulled ahead and ROLM never regained ground.

ROLM 9751
The Model 10 cannot use Cornet hardware (RPDN card); CORNet is a proprietary networking software (an extension of ISDN PRI protocols) for Siemens PBXs and the original 9751-9005 model. Also the cabinet is a different design from the other models (the Model 20 through 70 use the same cabinet design, etc.).

In the early 1990s, Siemens came out with new "9751-9006i" models called the Model 30 and Model 80, respectively. They were nothing like the original ROLM systems. The only devices that were kept from the older models were the RolmPhones and PhoneMail. The Mod 30/80 9006i series was a disaster for Siemens, and this caused a lot of old ROLM customers to jump ship to another vendor like Nortel or Avaya. The 9006i models were really HiCoM (HCM) 300 models sold overseas. Eventually, Siemens changed the name back to the HCM name, ending production in the late 1990s with Version 6.6 (original release was 6.1 or 9006 release 1).

Further reading

References

  NYTimes.com; September 27, 1984:  "At ROLM, an Independent Style"
 NYTimes.com; December 14, 1988:  "I.B.M. to Sell Rolm to Siemens"

1969 establishments in California
1998 disestablishments in California
American companies established in 1969
American companies disestablished in 1998
Companies based in Santa Clara, California
Computer companies established in 1969
Computer companies disestablished in 1998
Defunct companies based in the San Francisco Bay Area
Defunct computer companies of the United States
IBM acquisitions
Siemens
Technology companies based in the San Francisco Bay Area
Technology companies established in 1969
Technology companies disestablished in 1998
Telecommunications companies established in 1969
Telecommunications companies disestablished in 1998
Telephony equipment